EC Kapfenberg is a defunct professional ice hockey team that played in the Austrian Hockey League. Based in Kapfenberg, Austria, they were active from 1981 to 2002.

References

Defunct ice hockey teams in Austria
Ice hockey clubs established in 1981
2002 disestablishments in Austria
Former Austrian Hockey League teams